Jackson Township is a township in Randolph County, Arkansas, United States. Its total population was 241 as of the 2010 United States Census, a decrease of 10.41 percent from 269 in 2000.

According to the 2010 Census, Jackson Township is located at  (36.417455, -91.086920).

References

External links 

Townships in Arkansas
Populated places in Randolph County, Arkansas